Shiv Charan Goel is an Indian politician from the Aam Admi Party and a member of the Sixth Legislative Assembly of Delhi. He represents the  Moti Nagar (Assembly constituency) of Delhi and has been elected twice as the MLA of the constituency with a roaring margin of votes.  He is currently the Chairman of Acharya Bhikshu Hospital (Rogi Kalyan Samiti) situated in Moti Nagar. He is also a member of several Departments and committees like Special enquiry Committee of Sports, Standing committee on Health, Tihar Jail and Rohini Jail, Private Member's and Bills Resolution Committee, Reform of Business Advisory Committee of the Government of Delhi. Along with all his posts and offices, he is a dedicated social worker who constantly engages in the welfare of the society and the overall wellbeing and happiness of his people. He has a vision and a cause to serve the people of his country. Driven by extreme passion for the progress and betterment of the society he indulges in charity to always help the needy and the poor.

Early life and Career

Born on 6 February 1962 in New Delhi, he was raised in the capital city and received his primary education from New States Academy, Ashoka Park and did his High school from Swami Shivananda Memorial, East Punjabi Bagh. He also went to West Punjabi Bagh Government Senior Secondary Boys school for his class 11th and 12th. He was born in a lower income group family and led his early life in an extremely humble background. He belonged to a family of more than ten members where they struggled to fulfill their basic needs. The only source of income was a small shop the family managed to open in 1960 through their hard earned savings. While growing up he took forward the small business they had and turned it into a profit making business by setting up his iron and steel factory at Naraina, New Delhi. He got married in 1983 to Urmil Goel who is a home maker by profession and together they have two kids.

Political career
He had no plans initially to enter into politics. However, due to his honesty and dedication he was approached by some prominent figures of the Aam Aadmi Party in June 2012 who offered him to engage with the upcoming political party in the National Capital. After a few interactions with them he met the honourable Chief Minister of Delhi, Sri Arvind Kejriwal on 14 August 2012. He was extremely influenced by his dedication towards the country and the intentions to change the face of politics in India. Since then he got actively engaged into the Aam Aadmi Party and started attending all its meetings and proceedings regularly. In 2015 he contested the Legislative Assembly elections in Delhi from Moti Nagar constituency in West Delhi and won by a roaring margin of 15,200 votes defeating Sri Subhash Sachdeva of the Bhartiya Janta Party. He was re-elected as the MLA from Moti Nagar in February 2020 against the same opposition. Since then he has selflessly worked for the betterment and progress of his constituency and its residents. With his constant hard work and unparalleled dedication he has successfully achieved several milestones of progress and upliftment in his area, thus making it one of the best constituencies in the National Capital. He has got several roads, flyovers, hospitals, training center, community center and schools made in Moti Nagar and adjoining areas that made the life of the residents better and hassle free. He continues to serve the people around him and is one of the most loved and admired leaders in AAP.

Posts Held

See also

Sixth Legislative Assembly of Delhi
Delhi Legislative Assembly
Government of India
Politics of India
Aam Aadmi Party

Electoral performance

References 
 

Delhi MLAs 2015–2020
Delhi MLAs 2020–2025
Aam Aadmi Party politicians from Delhi
People from New Delhi
Living people
1962 births